Conmee may refer to:

Places
 Conmee, Ontario

People
James Conmee (1848-1913), Canadian businessman
John Conmee (1847-1910), Irish Jesuit educator
Marie Conmee (1933-1994),Irish film and stage actor and gay activist